The Academy of Journalism and Communication (AJC; Vietnamese: Học viện Báo chí và Tuyên truyền) is an academy with its campus in Hanoi, Vietnam. The academy was established in 1962 and now it is under the Ho Chi Minh National Academy of Politics and Public Administration. Main tasks of the academy are training bachelors and masters of Marxism – Leninism politics, Ho Chi Minh Thoughts subjects, officers of Thought – Culture, Press and Media.
There are over 255 teachers, researchers in academy, including 9 professors and associate professors, 152 Ph.Ds and Masters and 95 main teachers.

History
The Academy of Journalism and Communication was established on January 16, 1962, by Secretariat of the Communist Party of Vietnam, unified from 3 different schools: Nguyen Ai Quoc School campus 2, School of Propagandizing and Educating and People University.

In 1990, President of the Council of Ministers (now Prime Minister) recognized it as a university. Then, the academy was not just under the Secretariat of the Communist Party of Vietnam, which also a university in Vietnam's education system.

In 1993, Politburo of the Communist Party of Vietnam decided the AJC would come under the Ho Chi Minh National Academy of Politics.

During 50 years, AJC has many names:
 Central School of Propagandizing and Educating (1962 to 1969).
 Central School of Propagandizing and Training (1970 to 1983).
 Central School of Propagandizing and Training 1 (1984 to Feb 1990).
 University of Propagandizing and Educating (1990 to March 1993).
 Institute of Journalism and Communication (April 1993 to June 2005).
 Academy of Journalism and Communication (June 2005 to now).

Faculties

The AJC have 19 faculties and subjects. They are:

 Faculty of Philosophy
 Faculty of Economy
 Faculty of Scientific Socialism
 Faculty of Communist Party's History
 Faculty of Communist Party Building 
 Faculty of Political Science
 Faculty of Propaganda
 Faculty of Journalism (now is Institute of Journalism)
 Faculty of Public Relations and Advertising
 Faculty of Broadcasting
 Faculty of International Affairs
 Faculty of Publishing
 Faculty of Sociology
 Faculty of Culture and Development
 Faculty of Psychology and Education
 Faculty of State and Law
 Faculty of Ho Chi Minh Thought
 Faculty of Knowledge of General Education
 Faculty of Foreign Language

Achievements

References

Universities in Vietnam
Universities in Hanoi